Hermeus Corporation is an American startup company from Atlanta, Georgia focused on the development of commercial hypersonic aircraft. Their mission is to radically accelerate air travel through the development of multiple dual-use Mach 5 capable aircraft.

History
The company was founded in 2018 and received an initial round of funding led by Khosla Ventures. In March 2021, the company signed a Space Act Agreement with NASA for research and development of high-speed aircraft. Later in 2021, the company signed a contract with the United States Air Force, securing full funding for development of its Quarterhorse hypersonic jet.

In March 2022, Hermeus raised a $100 million Series B led by Sam Altman. The capital will be used to complete development of Hermeus' first aircraft, Quarterhorse, begin flight services operations, and accelerate development of Darkhorse – an uncrewed aircraft capable of sustained hypersonic flight. The lessons learned from development, flight test, airworthiness, and operations of Darkhorse will inform Hermeus' approach to developing its commercial passenger aircraft, Halcyon.

On November 17, 2022, Hermeus' Chimera turboramjet engine performed a successful transition from turbojet mode to ramjet mode in a simulated hypersonic flight. According to Hermeus, this test is considered notable for demonstrating the speed and efficiency with which the Chimera engine was developed (21 months with a budget of $18 million).

Products

Chimera engine 

Chimera is the "turbine-based combined cycle" (TBCC) engine powering Quarterhorse. At low speeds Chimera operates in turbojet mode. As temperature and the speed of the incoming air increases, Chimera uses a pre-cooler to reduce the temperature of the air coming into the turbojet, allowing the engine to draw out additional performance before switching to ramjet mode. The ability to "transition" between these two modes allows Quarterhorse to take off from a regular runway and then accelerate up to high-Mach speeds.

On November 17, 2022, Hermeus announced that it had demonstrated transition during testing at Notre Dame Turbomachinery Lab. Hermeus designed, built, and tested Chimera in 21 months for only $18 million.

Quarterhorse 

Hermeus' first aircraft will be Quarterhorse, a remotely piloted high-speed aircraft. Like its namesake, the American Quarter Horse, it will excel in sprinting short distances. The goal of Quarterhorse is to validate their proprietary Chimera engine in-flight and touch Mach 4+ speeds – breaking the nearly 50-year-old airspeed record held by the legendary SR-71.

Quarterhorse is on schedule to fly in Q4 of 2023.

Darkhorse 

Darkhorse is a hypersonic remotely piloted aircraft designed for defense and intelligence customers. The aircraft will have multi-mission flexibility and will be fully reusable.

In December 2022, Hermeus selected the Pratt & Whitney F100 engine turbofan to act as the turbine portion of Chimera II, the engine that will power Darkhorse.

Darkhorse is on track for engine testing in 2025.

Halcyon 
At those speeds, passengers could ostensibly travel from New York to Paris in 90 minutes, compared to 7 hours at subsonic speeds. That is approximately five times faster than any commercial aircraft available today. 

In August 2020, Hermeus received a $1.5 million contract from the United States Air Force to develop their proposed aircraft to enter and serve the American presidential fleet in the future and function as a possible Air Force One.

See also
 Aerion
 Boom Supersonic
 Exosonic
 Spike Aerospace

Notes

References

External links
 

Aircraft manufacturers of the United States
Aerospace companies of the United States
Supersonic transports
Hypersonic aircraft